Up, Up and Away is an album by saxophonist Sonny Criss recorded in 1967 and released on the Prestige label.

Reception

AllMusic awarded the album 4 stars with its review by Scott Yanow stating, "Sonny Criss' Prestige recordings of the late 1960s generally included a current pop tune or two along with some stronger jazz pieces. This 1998 CD reissue is of particular interest because the intense altoist is teamed with guitarist Tal Farlow... So overall this CD is more rewarding than it might appear at first glance".

Track listing
 "Up, Up and Away" (Jimmy Webb) – 5:32   
 "Willow Weep for Me" (Ann Ronell) – 5:12   
 "This is for Benny" (Horace Tapscott) – 6:23   
 "Sunny" (Bobby Hebb) – 5:55   
 "Scrapple from the Apple" (Charlie Parker) – 6:47   
 "Paris Blues" (Sonny Criss) – 7:29

Personnel
Sonny Criss – alto saxophone
Cedar Walton – piano
Tal Farlow – guitar
Bob Cranshaw – bass
Lenny McBrowne – drums

References

Sonny Criss albums
Prestige Records albums
1967 albums
Albums produced by Don Schlitten